Vananiya is a small village located 40 km from the town of Morbi in the state of Gujarat, India.

Population and census details 
Vavaniya's local language is Gujarati. The total population is 4356 and number of houses are 847. The percentage of females is 47.6% while the literacy rate is 44.4%. It is 30 km from the Arabian Sea. Vavania is 226 kilometers from Ahmedabad, Gujarat, on NH947.

Places of interest 
Shrimad Rajchandra Janma Bhuvan is a hall built commemorating the place of birth of Shrimad Rajchandra, a Jain saint and philosopher of the late 19th century renowned for being the spiritual guru of Mahatma Gandhi. It is visited by devotees of Rajchandra.

References 

Villages in Morbi district